Zeev Boker was Consul General of Israel to New England from October 2018 to March 2020. He was Israel's sixth Ambassador to Ireland and its first Ambassador to Slovakia.

Early life

Boker was born and spent his early life on Kibbutz Afek in the North of Israel. His parents had both been born in Poland and emigrated to Israel. When they met and married in their new homeland, they moved to the kibbutz and raised their three children there. Boker earned a master's degree in political science (cum laude) from the Hebrew University in Jerusalem.

Career

He has served as a diplomat since November 1987, when he joined the Ministry of Foreign affairs as a cadet.

He became the first Israeli ambassador to Slovakia (2006–2010). He also served in Prague as deputy chief of mission (1990–1993) and deputy Chief of mission in the Netherlands (1997–2003). He then became ambassador to Ireland.

In his role in New England, Boker also potential in for cooperation between the U.S. and Israel in the areas of academics and medicine, particularly digital health.

While Ambassador to Ireland, Boker was scheduled to speak at Trinity College Dublin. Pro-Palestinian students protested.  The event was cancelled when police and University security were unable to remove the protestors.  The college considered the protestors to be attacking free speech.

Personal

Boker and his wife Tali have three children.

References

Living people
Israeli Jews
Ambassadors of Israel to Slovakia
Ambassadors of Israel to Ireland
Year of birth missing (living people)
Israeli consuls
Hebrew University of Jerusalem Faculty of Social Sciences alumni